DWLC (1017 AM) Radyo Pilipinas is a radio station owned and operated by Philippine Broadcasting Service in the Philippines. Its studio is located at the Old Barangay Federation Bldg., Governor's Mansion Compound, Lucena City, and transmitter is located at Brgy. Talipan, Pagbilao.

Notable personalities

Wendell Songco Dionido I (née Wendell Dee)

References

News and talk radio stations in the Philippines
Radio stations in Lucena, Philippines
Radio stations established in 1962
Philippine Broadcasting Service
People's Television Network